Pahlevan of Iran is an annual Pahlevani Wrestling competition held in Iran, in which athletes from across the country compete. The champion earns the title of Pahlevan and the right to wear the Bazouband (championship armband). Though the competition has ancient roots, its modern form has been held only since 1944.

Described as "tangled up with the soul of Iranian peoples", the title is athletically and culturally prestigious in Iran. The Pahlevan armband was formerly awarded by the Shah of Iran and is now presented by the president of Iran.

Early Period (651-1450)
 Abu Moslem-e Khorasani
 Yaghub-e Layth
 Arslan Isra'il
 Babak khorramdin
 Asad Kermani
 Abdul Razagh Bashtini
 Shirdel Kohneh Savar
 Mahmood Kharazmi (Pahlavan-e Bozorg), was known as Pouriya-ye Vali
 Mohammad Abol-seyyed Abolkheyr
 Mahmood Malani
 Darvish Mohammad Khorassani

Middle Period (1450-1795)
 Mirza Beyk-e Kashani
 Beyk-e Khorassani
 Hossein-e Kord
 Mir Baqer
 Jalal Yazdi
 Kabir-e Esfahani (Pahlavan-e Bozorg)
 Kalb Ali Aqa Jar

Pre-Modern period (1795-)
Haj Seyyed Hasan Razaz (Pahlavan-e Bozorg), also known as Pahlavan Shoja'at
Ali Asghar Yazdi
Haj Reza Qoli Tehrani
Mohammad Mazar Yazdi
Shaban Siyah Qomi
Yazdi Bozrog (Pahlavan-e Bozorg)
Akbar Khorasani
Abolqasem Qomi
Hossein Golzar-e Kermanshahi
Sadeq-e Qomi
Mirza Hashem Akbarian Tefaghi, Moblsaz Esfahani
Yazdi Kuchak (last official Pahlavan of Iran)
Aziz Khan Rahmani /Kurdistani also known by Sanandaji(Gold Medal in 1945)

List of Modern Pahlevans

In Shahnameh

There are many Pahlevan in the epic poem Shahnameh. But the meaning of Pahlavan in Shahnameh is not only attributed to the wrestler. In Shahnameh, the word Pahlevan is referred to its ancient status as a title of honour granted by Shah of Persia. Pahlavan title was granted by the shah to the candidates whom beside their athletic manner, honesty, righteous were brave warrior; and the hero Rostam was given the title of Jahan Pahlavan, a title higher than Pahlavan, which most recently is used for Gholamreza Takhti.

References 

Wrestling competitions in Iran